Helen Milroy  is a consultant psychiatrist with the Western Australia Department of Health, specialising in child and adolescent psychiatry, and director of the Western Australian Centre for Aboriginal Medical and Dental Health. She is recognised as the first Indigenous Australian to become a medical doctor. She is also a storyteller who has written three books for children.

Biography 
Helen Milroy was born in Perth, and traces her ancestral lineage to the Palyku people of the Pilbara region of Western Australia. Milroy studied medicine at the University of Western Australia, becoming the country's first Indigenous medical doctor in 1983. Milroy was later appointed as professor of child and adolescent psychiatry.

Her sisters are artist and author Sally Morgan and professor Jill Milroy.

In 2013, Milroy was appointed as a commissioner to the Australian Government's Royal Commission into Institutional Responses to Child Sexual Abuse.

In 2018, Milroy was appointed as the first Indigenous commissioner to the Australian Football League.

Awards 
In 2011, Milroy was awarded the "Sigmund Freud Award" by the World Congress of Psychiatry in recognition for her contributions as an Indigenous health professional.
In 2018, Milroy was the recipient of the 2018 Australian Indigenous Doctor of the Year Award by the Australian Indigenous Doctor's Association (AIDA). She was named Western Australian of the Year in 2021.

Milroy was appointed a Member of the Order of Australia in the 2023 Australia Day Honours.

Books 
 Backyard Birds (Fremantle Press, 2020)
 Willy-Willy Wagtail: Tales from the Bush Mob (Magabala Books, 2020)
 Wombat, Mudlark and Other Stories (Fremantle Press, 2019) – 2020 Western Australian Premier's Book Award (shortlisted)

References 

Living people
Members of the Order of Australia
Indigenous Australian women academics
Australian psychiatrists
Australian women psychiatrists
Year of birth missing (living people)
Australian children's writers